Anne "Tanny" B. Crane is the President and CEO of Crane Group, former Chair of the Board of Directors for the Federal Reserve Bank of Cleveland, and Director on the Board of Wendy's International.  Tanny Crane, granddaughter of Crane Plastics Company founder Robert Crane Sr,  in 1987 as Director of Human Resources, and was promoted to Vice President of Sales and Marketing in 1993. She became the President of Crane Plastics in 1996. In January, 2003, she succeeded Jameson Crane to her current position.  She is also a member of the Dean's Advisory Council of the Fisher College of Business at Ohio State University, sits on the Board of the United Way of Central Ohio, is a member of the Columbus Partnership and the Columbus Foundation, and sits on the Board of the Greater Columbus Chamber of Commerce.

In 2016, she received the Columbus Foundation’s Spirit of Columbus Award. Buckeye Lifestyle Magazine called Crane "one of the city’s most important philanthropists" and "most visible stewards".

References

American women chief executives
Year of birth missing (living people)
Living people
Ohio State University people
Businesspeople from Columbus, Ohio
American chief executives of manufacturing companies
21st-century American women